The 2022 AFF U-18 Women's Championship was the 2nd edition of the AFF U-19 Women's Championship, an international women's youth football tournament organised by ASEAN Football Federation (AFF). It was hosted by Indonesia.

Australia beat Vietnam 2–0 in the final for their first title in the championship.

Participant teams 
There was no qualification, and all entrants advanced to the final tournament. The following teams from member associations of the AFF entered the tournament:

Venues
Matches were held in Jakabaring Sport City, with Gelora Sriwijaya Stadium as the main venue and Jakabaring Athletic Field as the alternate venue.

Group stage
 All times listed are WIB (UTC+7).

Group A

Group B

Knockout stage 
In the knockout stage, the penalty shoot-out was used to decide the winner if necessary.

Bracket

Semi-finals

Third place match

Final

Winner

Goalscorers

Final ranking
This table will show the ranking of teams throughout the tournament.

References 

AFF U-19 Women's Championship
AFF
AFF
AFF
2022 in Asian football